Rhyncoptidae is a family of mites belonging to the order Sarcoptiformes.

Genera:
 Rhincoptoides Fain, 1962
 Rhyncoptes Lawrence, 1956

References

Acari